Whaley Thomas Cartey better known as Ric Cartey (born in Atlanta, Georgia, 18 January 1937 - died in Palm Harbor, Florida on 5 August 2009) was an American rockabilly musician and songwriter. He formed a duo with guitarist Charlie Broome performing locally. Ric and Charlie's band was called the Jiva-Tones. He was most famously a co-writer with Carole Joyner of the hit "Young Love" a popular song published in 1956. First released as a single by him and his band The Jiva-Tones in 1956, the B-side being "'Oooh-Eeee". He was signed to a recording contract to RCA Victor. In 1958, he signed with NRC.

"Young Love" was made greatly popular by Sonny James, Tab Hunter, Sonny James, The Crew-Cuts, all in 1957 and covered by Lesley Gore in 1965 and very famously Donny Osmond in 1972. It was recorded as a country version by Connie Smith and Nat Stuckey as a duo in 1969.

Cartey was one of the first young singers on Atlanta's rock and roll scene, which would also encompass Jerry Reed, Ray Stevens, Joe South, Tommy Roe and Mac Davis etc.  In 1957 he worked with producer Chet Atkins in Nashville. In 1958, he released "Scratching On My Screen" with NRC Records. The song was a variation on Washboard Sam's 1939 blues song "Diggin' My Potatoes". Other songs include "Heart Throb", "I Wancha to Know" and "Born to Love One Woman".

Discography

Singles
1956: "Young Love" / "Oooh-Eee" 
1957: "Heart Throb" / "I Wancha to Know"
1957: "Born to Love One Woman" / "Let Me Tell You About Love"
1957: "Mellow Down Easy" / "My Babe"
1958: "Scratching On My Screen" / "My Heart Belongs to You"
1963: "Poor Me" / "Something In My Eye"

References

External links
Discogs: Ric Cartey page
45cat: Ric Cartey

American rockabilly musicians
1937 births
2009 deaths
People from Atlanta